Fred Åkeström grant is an allowance granted every year to "a person who has worked in a significant way to preserve, develop, and / or create Swedish visor." It was named after Fred Åkerström. The grant is awarded during the Visfestival and the prize money is 40,000 krona.

Grant winners 
 1987 – 
 1988 – Åsa Jinder
 1989 – Ewert Ljusberg
 1990 – Lena Willemark
 1991 – 
 1992 – 
 1993 – Mikael Samuelson & Mats Bergström
 1994 – Ola Magnell
 1995 – 
 1996 – Stefan Sundström
 1997 – 
 1998 – Björn Ulvaeus
 1999 – 
 2000 – Olle Adolphson
 2001 – 
 2002 – Kjell Höglund
 2003 – 
 2004 – 
 2005 – CajsaStina Åkerström
 2006 – 
 2007 – Alf Hambe
 2008 – Jack Vreeswijk
 2009 – Marie Bergman
 2010 – 
 2011 – 
 2012 – Stefan Andersson
 2013 –

References 

Swedish awards